All-Africa Korfball Championship (AAKC) is a korfball competition for African national teams organized by the International Korfball Federation. It has been held every four years since 2006 with the winner qualifying through to the IKF World Korfball Championship in the following year.

The first championship was held in South Africa with the host nation and Zimbabwe competing for a spot at the 2007 World Championship. After the same two teams competed in 2010, the competition expanded to four teams with Malawi and Zambia competing for the first time.

In 2022 the competition expanded with  Africa dividing into two region South and North- West. Ghana, Morocco and the host Ivory Coast participated in IKF AAKC North-West 2022.  The IKF All-Africa Korfball Championship South 2022 was hosted by the Korfball Federation of Zambia in Lusaka, Zambia, from 11-13 November 2022. IKF Africa Members from the IOC ANOCA zones 5, 6 and 7 were invited for this tournament, that served as a qualification event for the IKF World Korfball Championship 2023.

History

References

External links
International Korfball Federation

 
Korfball competitions
Korfball in Africa
African championships
Recurring sporting events established in 2006
2006 establishments in Africa